Trimmatom is a genus of gobies native to the Indian Ocean and the western Pacific Ocean.

Species
There are currently seven recognized species in this genus:
 Trimmatom eviotops (L. P. Schultz, 1943) (Red-barred rubble goby)
 Trimmatom macropodus R. Winterbottom, 1989 (Bigfoot dwarfgoby)
 Trimmatom nanus R. Winterbottom & Emery, 1981 (Midget dwarfgoby)
 Trimmatom offucius R. Winterbottom & Emery, 1981
 Trimmatom pharus R. Winterbottom, 2001 (Lifehouse dwarfgoby)
 Trimmatom sagma R. Winterbottom, 1989 (Saddled dwarfgoby)
 Trimmatom zapotes R. Winterbottom, 1989

References

Gobiidae